Spear of Destiny may refer to:

The Holy Lance, the spear reputedly used by a Roman centurion to pierce the side of the crucified Jesus
The Spear Lúin, a spear named in Irish narratives professed to be one of the four treasures of the Tuatha Dé Danann
The Spear of Destiny (1973), a non-fiction book by Trevor Ravenscroft
Spear of Destiny, a British rock band formed in 1983
Spear of Destiny, a 1992 video game prequel to Wolfenstein 3D

See also
 Sword of Destiny (disambiguation)
 Destiny (disambiguation)